Onchidina is a monotypic genus of air-breathing sea slugs, a shell-less marine pulmonate gastropod mollusks in the family Onchidiidae. Its sole member is the species Onchidina australis. Uniquely within the Onchidiidae, O. australis lives above the tidal zone in a fully terrestrial habitat.

References

Onchidiidae
Monotypic gastropod genera